Thomas or Tom Millington may refer to:

Thomas Millington (publisher) (fl. 1591–1603), London publisher
Sir Thomas Millington (physician) (1628–1703/4), English physician
Tom Millington (1883-1973), English footballer for Bury and Queens Park Rangers